The Royal Australian and New Zealand College of Radiologists (RANZCR) is the leading professional organisation for the promotion of the science and practice of the medical specialties of clinical radiology (diagnostic and interventional radiology) and radiation oncology in Australia and New Zealand. The College has members throughout the world. RANZCR provides the educational curricula for medical graduates training to enter the specialties.

RANZCR is independent of universities and is scrutinised and externally accredited against industry standards by the Australian Medical Council (AMC).

The official journal of the College is the Journal of Medical Imaging and Radiation Oncology.

History 

Very soon after the discovery of X-rays in 1895, and radium in 1896, members of the fledgling specialties of radiology and radiation therapy had begun practising across Australia and New Zealand.

In 1935, the Australian and New Zealand Association of Radiology was formed, with the purposes of setting minimum standards of training and conduct, stimulating interest in research, and otherwise enhancing the prestige and professionalism of the specialties. The Association was the third professional medical body to be formed in Australia.

In 1949 the Association became the College of Radiologists (Australia and New Zealand). Further name changes followed in 1952 (College of Radiologists of Australasia), 1972 (Royal Australasian College of Radiologists) and 1997 (The Royal Australian and New Zealand College of Radiologists).

The RANZCR head office was for many years located in rooms on Macquarie Street, Sydney. Larger premises were purchased in Lower Fort Street, the Rocks, Sydney, in 1977 where the College head office remained until its move to 51 Druitt Street, Sydney, in 1997. The College's New Zealand offices are located in Wellington.

RANZCR remains the peak body in Australia and New Zealand for practitioners of clinical radiology and radiation oncology, and continues to pursue the purposes of excellence in training, research and medical professionalism.

Armorial Bearings 

Following earlier enquiries to the Portcullis Pursuivant of Arms, the RANZCR Council submitted the relevant documentation (numbers of Fellows, Members, Associates and Life Members, relevant Memoranda and Article) and £365 fee to the College of Arms in 1963.

The following symbols are incorporated in the RANZCR crest:
 Colours reflect those used for gowns worn by members and the President
 The cross in the centre of the shield represents X-rays
 The stars on the shield signify the Southern Cross to indicate the Australasian location
 The flaming torch represents learning and research
 The crown composed of rays and upraised skeletal arm represent diagnostic radiology
 A griffin as one supporter is depicted with rays emanating from its body to represent therapeutic radiation oncology
 A lynx as the other supporter as it was considered by the Ancients to have eyesight so powerful it could see through solid objects
 A silver fern and wattle around the necks of the lynx and griffin representing New Zealand and Australia.

The Coat of Arms was granted by Queen Elizabeth II on 2 September 1964.

Motto 
Members were asked to suggest a motto.  (We Cast Light on Disease), suggested by Dr Colin Macdonald, was selected but not without protest regarding the accuracy of the Latin. Advice from the College of Arms and also Prof. A. J. Dunston, Professor of Latin at the University of Sydney, was that the suggested motto was in order and suitable.

Royal prefix 
Permission to use the ‘Royal’ prefix, first applied for in 1967 but rejected by the then Prime Minister, RG Menzies, was granted in September 1971 by W McMahon. On 28 July 1972, the Australasian College of Radiologists became ‘The Royal Australasian College of Radiologists’.

Governance 

RANZCR is led by clinicians who are democratically elected by the membership. The ultimate oversight and responsibility is vested in the RANZCR board of directors.

Presidents 
The following individuals have served as president of The Royal Australian and New Zealand College of Radiologists, or any precedent name of the College:

: Female presidents

Structure 

RANZCR has two faculties: the Faculty of Clinical Radiology (established 2013) and the Faculty of Radiation Oncology (established 1994).

Membership 
As of 31 December 2016, RANZCR had 3515 active members, including 2467 clinical radiologists, 421 radiation oncologists, and 627 trainees.

There are six categories of membership, each with their own particular rights, entitlements and responsibilities as prescribed in the RANZCR's Articles of Association:
 Fellows
 Life Members
 Honorary Fellows
 Associate Members
 Student Members
 Educational Affiliate Members

Training 
RANZCR is responsible for the training of clinical radiologists and radiation oncologists in Australia and New Zealand. Training, under the auspices of RANZCR, can also be undertaken in Singapore.

Following a 1998 Australian Medical Council (AMC) undertaking to review all specialist medical training programs in Australia, RANZCR volunteered to be one of two medical colleges to undertake a review of their training programs. This 2004 review identified that a more structured approach to the training program assessment, including a formal curriculum, was required.

Curricula were developed for each of the radiation oncology and clinical radiology training programs, launched in 2008 and 2009 respectively. These curricula follow key educational principles:
 Explicit curriculum reflecting the goals and philosophy of the program
 Clearly defined syllabus and learning objectives
 Well-structured rotational training system
 Transparent, accountable, and appropriate assessment processes
 Broad and relevant assessment of all aspects of trainee competency

Following successful completion of training, graduates are awarded Fellowship of The Royal Australian and New Zealand College of Radiologists (FRANZCR).

Specialist medical registration with the Medical Board of Australia “is available to medical practitioners who have been assessed by an AMC accredited specialist college as being eligible for fellowship.”

Clinical radiology Fellows and trainees are able to undertake further sub-specialty study in nuclear medicine through the combined Royal Australasian College of Physicians (RACP)/RANZCR nuclear medicine training program.

References

External links
 The Royal Australian and New Zealand College of Radiologists
 Link to the Royal Australian and New Zealand College of Radiologists's coat of arms

Medical associations based in Australia
Specialist medical colleges in Australia
Radiology organizations
Medical education in Australia
Australian and New Zealand Radiologists
Organisations based in Australia with royal patronage
Medical associations based in New Zealand
Organisations based in New Zealand with royal patronage
1949 establishments in Australia